Rocky Mount Event Center (RMEC) is a 165,000-square-foot multipurpose facility for entertainment and athletic events in Rocky Mount, North Carolina that opened in 2018. Its athletic space includes eight basketball courts, sixteen volleyball courts, climbing walls, and a ropes course. It also has a family entertainment center, meeting rooms, banquet space, and concession areas. It holds local, regional and national sporting tournaments as well as concerts, entertainment events, corporate conferences, and trade shows.

References

Music venues in North Carolina
Sports venues in North Carolina
Indoor arenas in North Carolina